Lupión is a municipality in the province of Jaén, Spain.

Villages
Lupión
Guadalimar, a village established by the Instituto Nacional de Colonización in the Franco era located 6 km NW of Lupión.

References

Municipalities in the Province of Jaén (Spain)